Fastow is a surname. Notable people with the surname include:

 Andrew Fastow (born 1961), former Enron chief financial officer 
 Lea Fastow (born 1961), former Enron assistant treasurer, wife of Andrew

See also
 Fastiv